William R. Thompson (born May 14, 1949) is an American politician from South Dakota. A member of the Democratic Party, he served in the South Dakota House of Representatives from 2003 to 2010.

External links
South Dakota Legislature - Bill Thompson official SD House website

Project Vote Smart - Representative William R. 'Bill' Thompson (SD) profile
Follow the Money - Bill Thompson
2008 2006 2004 2002 2000 campaign contributions

Democratic Party members of the South Dakota House of Representatives
1949 births
Living people
Politicians from Aberdeen, South Dakota
Politicians from Sioux Falls, South Dakota